The Gold Stick and the Silver Stick are bodyguard positions in the British Royal Household, personal attendants to the Sovereign on ceremonial occasions.

Gold Stick 

Although now only in evidence on ceremonial and state occasions, the office of Gold Stick dates from Tudor times, when two officers were placed close to the Sovereign's person to protect him or her from danger. The office is held jointly by the Colonels of the Life Guards (LG) and the Blues and Royals (RHG/D), both being Regiments of the Household Cavalry of the Household Division. The Gold Sticks, of whom one at any time is on duty as Gold Stick-in-Waiting, were originally entrusted with the personal safety of the Sovereign. Since the reign of Queen Victoria these officers' duties have been mainly ceremonial; they attend all state occasions and take part in the processions for the Coronation and the State Opening of Parliament. On these occasions, Gold Stick conveys the Sovereign's orders to the Household Cavalry. The name derives from the staff of office, which has a gold head.

The current Colonel of the Blues and Royals is the Princess Royal, the daughter of the late Queen Elizabeth II and younger sister to King Charles III.

The current Colonel of the Life Guards is Lieutenant General Sir Edward Smyth-Osbourne.

Silver Stick 

The Silver Stick is the Commander of the Household Cavalry and holds the rank of colonel. Silver Stick-in-Waiting is the deputy (assistant) to Gold Stick-in-Waiting, but there are occasions when Silver Stick only is summoned for duty—for example, on the arrival of a head of state on a state visit.

The office was created in 1678, and until 1950 was held by the lieutenant-colonels in command of the Household Cavalry regiments. Originally, only the Life Guards were included; in 1820, the Royal Horse Guards were added, and since 1969 the Blues and Royals have been included. They served by monthly rotation. Now the (Colonel) Commander Household Cavalry holds the office alone. Through the authority of the Gold Stick he has the detail of regiments and individuals to carry out royal duties. In general, the Silver Stick has charge of all ceremonial duties for the Sovereign.

Silver Stick's principal aide when on duty is termed Silver Stick Adjutant.

Scotland 
There are separate Gold and Silver Sticks in Scotland, and these are the senior officers of the Sovereign's Bodyguard of the Royal Company of Archers.

References 

Bodyguards
Ceremonial officers in the United Kingdom
Household Cavalry
Positions within the British Royal Household